The 1994 Giro d'Italia was the 77th edition of the Giro d'Italia, one of cycling's Grand Tours. The field consisted of 153 riders, and 99 riders finished the race.

By rider

By nationality

References

1994 Giro d'Italia
1994